The Planter's Wife  is a 1952 British war drama film directed by Ken Annakin, and starring Claudette Colbert, Jack Hawkins and Anthony Steel. It is set against the backdrop of the Malayan Emergency and focuses on a rubber planter and his neighbours who are fending off a campaign of sustained attacks by Communist insurgents while also struggling to save their marriage.

The film was retitled Outpost in Malaya in the United States.

Plot
During the Malayan Emergency, communist terrorists attack an isolated rubber plantation, killing the manager. This concerns neighbouring planter Jim Frazer, who is struggling to produce rubber under constant attacks. Jim is having domestic difficulties with his American wife Liz, who is planning to take their son Mike to England and not return. British Inspector Hugh Dobson urges Liz to come clean with Jim.

Jim gives a lift to Wan Li, a Chinese man, the uncle of a little servant girl injured in the attack on Jim's neighbour. After Wan Li goes to the police, the communists murder him. Mike is almost bitten by a cobra but a mongoose kills the snake.

A bandit attacks Liz and corners her, but she shoots him with a pistol. Jim takes her home. When she awakes the plantation is under attack. Jim fights off the communists with the help of his friend Nair. Liz decides to stay in Malaya.

Cast

Production

Development
The movie was based on a 1951 novel Planter's Wife by Sidney Charles George. It was originally known as White Blood. This was the name given to liquid rubber as it is tapped from trees. However the title was criticised by the Colonial Office and overseas distributors because it could be interpreted as referring to racial discrimination, so it was changed to The Planter's Wife.

The film was co-financed by the National Film Finance Corporation and The Rank Organisation. The producer, John Stafford, was freelance. Rank's head of production gave the script by Guy Elmes to Ken Annakin who agreed to direct.

Casting
To encourage a receptive American audience, Earl St. John sent Annakin to Hollywood in November 1951 to select an American actress for the female lead.  Annakin interviewed Norma Shearer, Loretta Young, Joan Crawford, Olivia de Havilland and Claudette Colbert.  Though all the actresses expressed satisfaction with the script, none wanted to leave their film and television commitments in Hollywood for an extended overseas location shoot except for Claudette Colbert. Claudette Colbert was paid £20,000 to play the lead.

The role of Jim Fraser was meant to be played by Michael Redgrave but in December 1951 Jack Hawkins was cast instead.   In January 1952 Antony Steel joined the cast; it was one of several films where he played in support of an older British actor.

Indian dancer Ram Gopal was given his first dramatic role as the overseer. Child actor Peter Asher – who later went on to a successful career as musician, singer (as half of the 1960s' "Peter & Gordon" duo) and record producer – plays the couple's son, Mike. Among the Burmese, Indian and Malay extras was Khin Maung, a noted Burmese painter.

Future director Don Sharp has a small role.

Shooting
Colbert left for Britain in February 1951 and stayed there three months.

Director Ken Annakin and a team gathered anecdotes from planters, policemen and soldiers in Malaya and shot second unit sequences there as well as Singapore and Malacca but for safety reasons during the ongoing Emergency, much of the filming was done in Ceylon, on the advice of Rank's Asian representative, John Dalton. The majority of the film was shot in London at Pinewood Studios.

Colbert impressed Annakin with her detailed technical knowledge of lighting and camera work and confided in Annakin that she had never been called upon to do real action scenes in Hollywood and quickly became adept in small arms use.

To shoot the cobra vs mongoose fight, the room set was built in a Ceylon zoo.  When several of the local mongooses ran away from the cobra, the zookeeper said "Ï'm afraid our Singhalese mongooses are not used to fighting; I'll have to get you some North-Indian variety".  Imported from Madras, the Indian mongoose engaged in a true fight to the finish with the cobra.

Reception

Box office
The film was the sixth most popular movie of the year at the British box office in 1952, after The Greatest Show on Earth, Where No Vultures Fly, Son of Paleface, Ivanhoe and Mandy. It was followed by The Quiet Man, The World in His Arms, Angels One Five (also with Hawkins), Reluctant Heroes, The African Queen and The Sound Barrier. Despite Colbert's presence, the film only took £32,000 in the United States. However it was a success in other international markets.

Critical
The critic from the Daily Worker called it "the most viciously dishonest war propaganda picture yet made in Britain."

The Los Angeles Times said "the atmosphere is more plausible than the melodrama."

Variety said "The jungle campaign against local terrorists is depicted against a • commonplace domestic drama" and said "later action sequences compen- sate for the lame opening."

Legacy
Ken Annakin later said he was "quite proud" of the film. The success of the movie led to Rank's head of production Earl St John to commission another colonial war film, about Britain's struggle against the Mau Mau, Simba.

References

External links
 
 
 
Review of film at New York Times
The Planter's Wife at Letterbox DVD
Review of film at Variety
The Planter's Wife at BFI

1952 films
1950s war drama films
British war drama films
British black-and-white films
Films shot at Pinewood Studios
Films shot in Sri Lanka
Films set in Malaysia
Films directed by Ken Annakin
British drama films
1952 drama films
Films about the Malayan Emergency
1950s English-language films
1950s British films